Robert Standish may refer to:

 Robert Standish, pseudonym of the English novelist Digby George Gerahty
 Robert Standish (artist) (born 1964), American artist